Nathan "Natie" Kirsh (born 6 January 1932) is a South African born, Swazi billionaire businessman. He heads the Kirsh Group, which holds a majority stake in New York state cash and carry operation Jetro Holdings, owner of Restaurant Depot and Jetro Cash & Carry. The Group also holds equity and investments in Australia, Eswatini, the UK, the US, and Israel. 

Forbes estimated his wealth at $5.3 billion in April 2022. He was also listed on the UK’s Sunday Times Rich List 2018, and the wealthiest person in Swaziland by Forbes.

Early life and education
Nathan "Natie" Kirsh was born in South Africa on 6 January 1932, and grew up in a Jewish family in Potchefstroom, where he matriculated from Potchefstroom Boys High, in 1949. Kirsh earned a Bachelor of Commerce at the University of the Witwatersrand, in 1952. He also holds an honorary doctorate from the University of Swaziland.

Career
In 1952, Kirsh began assisting his mother with the operation of his father's original malt factory in Potchefstroom, then, in 1958, launched his own first venture, founding a corn milling and malt business in Eswatini.

After having returned to South Africa, in 1968; in 1970, Kirsh acquired Moshal Gevisser, a South African wholesale food distributor with a pilot cash and carry program. At the time, the South African apartheid government prevented white business-owners from operating in black townships, and Kirsh began using Moshal Gevisser to supply goods to black shopkeepers. As a cash and carry business, Moshal Gevisser became a dominant food retailer in South Africa.

In June 1976, he founded Jetro, a cash and carry store in Brooklyn, New York. He acquired Restaurant Depot in 1994, then opened its first New York retail outlet in 1995, and Jetro and Restaurant Depot began operating as sister businesses under Jetro Holdings. In 2003, Warren Buffett agreed to buy a minority share of Jetro Holdings, however, he and Kirsh could not agree on terms. As of August 2018, Kirsh owned 75 percent of Jetro Holdings, which had about 115 Jetro Cash & Carry and Restaurant Depot stores in the United States. That year, the Independent reported that several of Kirsh's companies were registered in the British Virgin Islands and in Liberia, both of which are listed on the Organisation for Economic Co-operation and Development’s tax haven "grey list". Kirsh Holdings Group, Kirsh's primary holding group, continues to own half of Swazi Plaza Properties.

In the late 1970s, he also acquired Magal Security Systems from Israel Aerospace Industries, listing the company on Nasdaq in 1993. In 2009, Kirsh was a director and held a 24.2 percent stake in Magal Security, which met controversy by providing fences in Israel. In 2014, Kirsh sold his 40 percent stake in Magal to FIMI.

Kirsh left South Africa in 1986, after selling much of Kirsh Industries to Sanlam, In 2006, his companies included Mira Mag and Ki Corporation. Through Kifin Limited, part of Ki Corporation, by 2008, he also held a stake in Minerva, dropping a bid for majority ownership in 2010.

By early 2018, Kirsh retained retail and property interests in Britain, the United States, Australia, and Swaziland.

Personal life
Kirsh is married to Frances Herr, and they have three children, one son, Philip Kirsh, and two daughters. They reside in Ezulwini, Eswatini, and he holds citizenship in Eswatini.

Philanthropy
He established the Kirsh Foundation, an international charitable organization. Its projects include a microfinance venture in collaboration with Swazi chiefs to provide "affordable loans and financial literacy training to Swazi women." As of 2010, Kirsh's seed fund, Inhlanyelo, had financed "5,500 successful small businesses." By 2015, around 20,000 people were employed by small-scale businesses started by the fund.

In 2021, Kirsh funded a mission for humanitarian NGO IsraAID to aid with the COVID-19 vaccine rollout in Eswatini.

See also
 History of the Jews in Eswatini
 History of the Jews in South Africa
 History of the Jews in Southern Africa

References

Living people
1932 births
South African billionaires
Swazi businesspeople
Swazi billionaires
Swazi Jews
Naturalized citizens of Eswatini
South African Jews
South African emigrants to Eswatini
University of the Witwatersrand alumni
20th-century businesspeople
21st-century businesspeople